Peter John Whiting (born 6 August 1946) is a former New Zealand rugby union player. A lock, Whiting represented Auckland at a provincial level, and was a member of the New Zealand national side, the All Blacks, from 1971 to 1976, and was known as a superb lineout expert. He played 56 matches for the All Blacks including 20 internationals.

References

External links
 
 

1946 births
Living people
Rugby union players from Auckland
People educated at Auckland Grammar School
New Zealand rugby union players
New Zealand international rugby union players
Auckland rugby union players
Rugby union locks